Frenchmans Bayou is an unincorporated community in Mississippi County, Arkansas, United States. Frenchmans Bayou has a post office with ZIP code 72338.

Education 
Public education for elementary and secondary students is provided by the Rivercrest School District (formerly Southern Mississippi County School District). Students graduate from Rivercrest High School which located near Wilson.

References

Unincorporated communities in Mississippi County, Arkansas
Unincorporated communities in Arkansas